Mamy Gervais Nirina Randrianarisoa (born 7 November 1984) is a Malagasy footballer who plays as a centre back for Réunionnais club JS Saint-Pierroise and the Madagascar national team.

Career 
He previously playing for Malagasy clubs FC Antsaniony and Ajesaia, in Réunion for AJ Petite-Île and AS Possession.

International 
Randrianarisoa has played 26 matches and scored a goal for Madagascar.

Honours

Club
Ajesaia
 THB Champions League (2) : Champion : 2007, 2009 
 Super Coupe de Madagascar (2) : 2007, 2009 
 Coupe de Madagascar (1) : 2006 

Saint-Pierroise
 Réunion Premier League (4) : 2016,2017,2018,2019
 Coupe de la Réunion  (2) : 2018, 2019

National Team
Football at the Indian Ocean Island Games silver medal:2007
Knight Order of Madagascar: 2019

References

1984 births
Living people
Malagasy footballers
Association football central defenders
Madagascar international footballers
2019 Africa Cup of Nations players
Ajesaia players
Malagasy expatriate footballers
Malagasy expatriate sportspeople in Réunion
Expatriate footballers in Réunion
People from Antsirabe
Recipients of orders, decorations, and medals of Madagascar